"Renaissance" is a song by British electronic group M People, released on 28 February 1994 as the fourth and final single from their second album, Elegant Slumming (1994). In Australia, it was released as the third single from the album. It was written by Mike Pickering and Paul Heard and produced by M People. The song peaked at number five on the UK Singles Chart following the band's first win for Best British Dance Act at the 1994 BRIT Awards.

Background
At the time of "Renaissance"'s release, M People were touring the second leg of their 15-date Elegant Slumming UK Tour and riding the height of their musical fortunes with their double platinum album. "How Can I Love You More (Mixes)", "One Night in Heaven", "Moving on Up" and "Don't Look Any Further" had already provided them with four consecutive singles and this became their fifth.

Composition
The song features pounding italo-piano chords and is laden with synths alongside an insistent bassline and classic house beat. Lyrically, it is in total contrast to the angry "breaking free" sung in "Moving on Up" to looking forward to coming home to one glorious night when singer Heather Small promises to "make you scream aloud with joy" – but "there'll be no day there'll be no night".

Critical reception
Irish Evening Herald noted the "thudding pulse" of the song. Ben Thompson from The Independent viewed it as "very spirited" and a "potential single". Kingston Informer declared it as "a happening tune from a band who can do no wrong at the moment." Howard Cohen from The Miami Herald complimented its "steady drum kick, pumping bass and trance-like beat". A reviewer from Music & Media wrote that "the pineapple-shaped hairdo of Heather Small is the eyecatcher in the videos, and her massive voice the focal point for the ears, enjoying a renaissance of '70s disco." Andy Beevers from Music Week named it Pick of the Week in the category of Dance, saying "it looks certain to be another big hit". He added that "this piano-powered track, with its catchy "I'm coming home" hook, will be instantly familiar to many as the theme for the student documentary, The Living Soap."

Chart performance
Out of the nine M People previous single releases at that point, this single was only the second to chart and peak in its first week (the only other single to do so at that point was predecessor "Don't Look Any Further"). "Renaissance" entered the chart and peaked in its first week at number five with sales of 89,000 copies in its first week, but made a steady descent out of the chart within seven weeks. When "Renaissance" left the chart, it had sold in total 179,000 copies. In the two weeks prior to "Renaissance"'s release, Elegant Slumming climbed back into the Top Ten at eight climbing to six once the song had been released, then rising further once again to peak at number four weeks later. For the second time, M People recorded simultaneous single and album Top 10s for two weeks, being at numbers five and six respectively and at six and five respectively the week after in March 1994. "Renaissance" was also used as the theme tune to the BBC2 show "The Living Soap" which helped the single sales.

Music video
The accompanying music video was filmed in San Francisco in January 1994 while the band promoted the launch of the US version of the album on the Sony label. Directed by Award winning Director of Photography Jeff Baynes for 'Eye Eye Ltd'/'Tatooist International' Production companies; Heather, Mike, Paul and Shovell were filmed together during the choruses with Heather in the driving seat of a classic black convertible American Cadillac with her bandmates as passengers all singing along or in a variety of places such riding in a classic Jag with Heather in the driving seat around the bustling American streets, driving past trams, and along a freeway. Heather has since admitted that at the time she was not qualified to drive and kept turning the wheel in the wrong direction. Other notable landmarks seen include the Park Bowl and Xing seen on the road.
There are also some internal scenes in a studio with Heather dancing and singing to camera with her three bandmates dancing behind her. There are also close-ups on Paul's hands playing chords on the piano and Shovell's drumming.

Live performances
Since its release, M People have continued to perform this song as their show opener for all their tours to this day, and the refrain "I'm coming..." is what Heather sings off-stage before making her entrance to the instrumental.

Remixes
Remixes of the single were provided by Roger S., Macready, Da Silva and John Digweed and M People themselves who also included the original Album mix of the single alongside the Radio Edit and Master Mix.

Airplay
"Renaissance" was serviced to radio three weeks before physical release when "Don't Look Any Further" was still in the Airplay Top 30 from two months earlier. It entered the Top 50 at number 45 then moved up 26 places in its second week to number 19, finally peaking at number 6. The new instrumental, tighter verses and stronger structure plus its use as a theme tune of a popular BBC show, The Living Soap, all propelled the song's success very quickly.
"Renaissance" has the distinction of being the only ever M People single to be written and recorded in just one day. This was partly because the band were under pressure from their record label, DeConstruction, to have finished and finalised the album by the end of the Summer 1993. Therefore, the tweaking of the track was essential to become a carefree dance single.

Track listings
 12" maxi
 "Renaissance" (M People master mix)
 "Renaissance" (John Digweed's full on mix)
 "Renaissance" (Roger S. uplifting club mix)

 CD maxi
 "Renaissance" (Radio mix)
 "Renaissance" (M People master mix)
 "Renaissance" (John Digweed's full on mix)
 "Renaissance" (Roger S. uplifting club mix)
 "Renaissance" (Album mix)

Charts

References

1994 singles
1994 songs
Deconstruction Records singles
M People songs
Songs written by Mike Pickering
Songs written by Paul Heard